Scopula albida is a moth of the family Geometridae. It was described by Warren in 1899. It is endemic to Uganda.

References

Moths described in 1899
albida
Insects of Uganda
Endemic fauna of Uganda
Moths of Africa
Taxa named by William Warren (entomologist)